Violence against transgender people includes emotional, physical, sexual, or verbal violence. The term has also been applied to hate speech directed at transgender people and at depictions of transgender people in the media that reinforce negative stereotypes about them. Trans and non-binary gender adolescents can experience bashing in the form of bullying and harassment. When compared to their cisgender peers, trans and non-binary gender youth are at increased risk for victimization, which has been shown to increase their risk of substance abuse.

Discrimination, including physical or sexual violence against trans people due to transphobia or homophobia, is a common occurrence for trans people. Hate crimes against trans people are common even recently, and "in some instances, inaction by police or other government officials leads to the untimely deaths of transgender victims."

An infamous incident was the December 1993 rape and murder of Brandon Teena, a young trans man, by two male friends after they found out that he had been assigned female at birth. These events gained international attention after being depicted in the film Boys Don't Cry (1999), which earned Hilary Swank an Academy Award for Best Actress.

Differentiation from gay bashing 

Unlike gay bashing, trans bashing is committed because of the target's actual or perceived gender identity or gender expression, not sexual orientation.

At least since the Stonewall riots in 1969, people from the greater trans communities have often been politically aligned with the lesbian, gay, and bisexual communities.  However, researchers and some activists from the greater trans communities argue trans bashing should be categorized separately from violence committed on the basis of sexual orientation ("gay-bashing"). Anti-trans bias crimes have been conceptually and characteristically distinguished from homophobic crimes in the scholarly research. One argument is that conflating violence against trans peoples with violence against gay people erases the identities of people in the greater trans communities and the truth of what happens to them.  However, campaigns against gay bashing and trans bashing are often seen as having a common cause.

In one case, perpetrators accused of hate crimes against trans people have tried to use a trans panic defense, an extension of gay panic defense. The jury deadlocked, but there is evidence they rejected the trans-panic defense. One law journal provided an analysis of the trans-panic defense, arguing in part that the emotional premise of a trans panic defense (shock at discovering unexpected genitals) is different from the emotional premise of a gay panic defense (shock at being propositioned by a member of the same sex, perhaps because of one's repressed homosexuality).

Laws covering gender identity

International
The United Nations adopted their Universal Declaration of Human Rights in 1948 as the first global declaration of human rights. There are a number of articles in the declaration that have been suggested to specifically pertain to transgender people and violence (including, but not limited to, physical, psychological, legal, systemic, emotional, and political violence), although LGBT rights are not explicitly outlined in the document.

 Article 2 entitles individuals to all of the rights and freedoms set forth in the declaration "without distinction of any kind, such as race, colour, sex, language, religion, political or other opinion, national or social origin, property, birth or other status". 
 Article 5 states that "[n]o one shall be subjected to torture or to cruel, inhuman or degrading treatment or punishment."
 Article 7 states that "[a]ll are equal before the law and are entitled without any discrimination to equal protection of the law. All are entitled to equal protection against any discrimination in violation of this Declaration and against any incitement to such discrimination". 
 Article 9 bans "arbitrary arrest, detention or exile" (which, according to Article 2, is protected from distinction based on identity or belief).
 Article 20 states that "[e]veryone has the right to freedom of opinion and expression; this right includes freedom to hold opinions without interference and to seek, receive and impart information and ideas through any media and regardless of frontiers."

North America

United States

In the United States, currently seventeen states plus the District of Columbia have hate crime laws protecting people victimized on the basis of their gender identity (they are California, Colorado, Connecticut, Delaware, Hawaii, Illinois, Maryland, Massachusetts, Minnesota, Missouri, Nevada, New Jersey, New Mexico, New Hampshire, Maine, Oregon, Rhode Island, Tennessee, Vermont, Virginia, Utah, Washington, and Washington, D.C.).

In the late 2000s in Seattle's gay village of Capitol Hill, there was evidence of an increase in incidents of trans bashing.

The Matthew Shepard Act expanded the federal hate crime laws to include gender, gender identity, and sexual orientation. In order to qualify as a federal hate crime in the United States, the crime must include successful or attempted bodily injury due to the use of firearm, explosives, weapons, fire, or incendiary devices. Hate crimes are covered by state, rather than federal laws unless the victim or defendant travel across state lines or national borders; using an interstate commuting route; the weapon has been brought across state lines; or if the conduct interferes with or otherwise affects commerce across state lines. This means that, unless hate crimes under the federal definition occur in a way that does not just affect one state, states have the freedom to implement their own hate crime laws. The protections of these laws range widely. Pennsylvania, for example, has not included gender identity in their hate crime protections since it was rescinded from the law in 2008.

'Bathroom bills' to enforce gendered bathroom use

Bathroom bills are bills proposed with relation to bathroom access and gender identity. There have been a number of bills proposed in the United States intended to limit access to restrooms for those who do not identify with the sex on their birth certificate. Some of these bills are justified with the rationale of protecting cisgender women from violent acts committed by cisgender men entering their facilities under the pretense of identifying as transgender women, although there is no evidence thus far of any instances of this.

Some transgender people are content, and may even prefer, using gender-neutral bathrooms, but others expect the right to use the bathroom of the gender with which they identify. The Gay, Lesbian, and Straight Education Network found that singling out trans students by offering them alternative facility options may backfire by increasing their chances of disengaging from school or dropping out entirely. Using bathrooms that are incongruent with the gender one presents as breaks social norms while following laws, and one study found that cisgender people report discomfort at the incongruous appearance between someone's gender presentation and the bathroom they're in even when the bathroom matches their assigned sex.

Harassment of transgender people in bathrooms

It is transgender people who are likely to be harassed in bathrooms by cisgender people, not the other way around. In one survey, 70 percent of the transgender respondents had faced discrimination when attempting to use a restroom of their gender identity, including "denial of access to facilities, verbal harassment, and physical assault." An example of such harassment occurred in 2018, when California Republican Congressional candidate Jazmina Saavedra said she heard the "voice of a man" from a locked stall in the women's restroom of a fast-food restaurant in Los Angeles and filmed herself chasing the person out of the restaurant with assistance from the restaurant manager. In the video, Saavedra said she was prepared to use pepper spray and a stungun against the transgender woman. This kind of tactic can result in public outing of a transgender person's current or former gender identity.

One survey of transgender populations conducted in Washington, DC, by the group DC Trans Coalition, "found that 70 percent of survey respondents report experiencing verbal harassment, assault, and being denied access to public toilets."  It also found that "54 percent of all respondents reported having some sort of physical problem from trying to avoid using public toilets, such as dehydration, kidney infections, and urinary tract infections" making access to safe restrooms a public health issue.

On 23 February 2020, a restaurant patron in Toa Baja, Puerto Rico made a police report that a transgender woman had entered the women's bathroom. Police arrived at the restaurant and spoke to the transgender woman. Someone filmed the police interaction and posted the video to social media. Later that day, the transgender woman—Alexa Negrón Luciano, also known as Neulisa Luciano Ruiz—was murdered.

Europe

Malta

Malta passed the 'Gender Identity, Gender Expression, and Sex Characteristics Act in 2015. This bill states that all citizens of Malta have the right to
 The recognition of their gender identity;
 The free development of their person according to their gender identity;
 Be treated according to their gender identity and, particularly, to be identified in that way in the documents providing their identity therein; and
 Bodily integrity and physical autonomy.

This act protects the gender identity of a person at all times. It also states that "person shall not be required to provide proof of a surgical procedure for total or partial genital reassignment, hormonal therapies or any other psychiatric, psychological or medical treatment to make use of the right to gender identity." The act allows parents to postpone listing gender on a child's birth certificate and prohibits “non-medically necessary treatments on the sex characteristics of a person.”

In the media

Media can contribute to trans bashing through misinformation and scare tactics. Transgender individuals are oftentimes misrepresented negatively in media, or not represented in media at all. Transgender individuals may be portrayed in the media as curiosities or oddities, as mentally unstable persons, and/ or as predators. A public example of this is the attention paid to the transition of Chelsea Manning, a transgender U.S. Army soldier imprisoned for releasing classified documents to WikiLeaks. A Fox News story on Manning's transition was introduced with the Aerosmith song "Dude (Looks Like a Lady)", while host Gretchen Carlson referred to Chelsea by her deadname, mocking The New York Times for "helping him" by using Manning's preferred gender pronoun. The Army refused to let her grow her hair as long as female prisoners, and continued referring to her using her deadname so as "to avoid confusion" until a court mandated her correct gender pronouns.

Trans health
According to the 2011 National Transgender Discrimination Survey Report on Health and Health Care (NTDSR), which surveyed 6,450 transgender and gender non-conforming people, people who do not identify with their birth sex face obstacles to getting healthcare and have a greater likelihood of facing health issues related to their gender identity.

Mental health

Transgender people experience greater mental health problems, such as depression, anxiety, suicide attempts, and post traumatic stress disorder (PTSD), as well as physical health disparities (e.g., cardiovascular disease).  Trans people also have a higher rate of suicide attempts than the population as a whole.  In 2013, 2.2% of U.S. adults had attempted suicide while 41% of trans people had attempted suicide at some point in their life in 2011. The rate of attempted suicide in transgender individuals increased to 51% for those bullied or harassed in school, 55% for those who recently lost a job due to bias, and 61% and 64% for those who were victims of physical and sexual assault, respectively.
Low self-esteem in transgender people has been linked to being at high-risk for HIV transmission. In 2008, the rate of HIV in transgender women in North America was 27.7%.

Access to healthcare

In the 2010 and 2011 NTDSRs, 19% of the people surveyed reported having been refused medical care due to their gender identity and 50% reported lack of provider knowledge of transgender health needs.
Under the Affordable Care Act, it is illegal for any health program receiving federal funding to discriminate based on gender identity. Discrimination includes refusal to admit, treat or provide any services that are available for other patients; subjection of patients to intrusive examination; harass or refuse to respond to harassment by other staff or patients; refusal to provide support services; obligation to participate in conversion therapy; and any sort of interference in the pursuit of health care rights.

Racial disparities

Race has been shown to compound manifestations of existing discrimination on the basis of gender identity.
Black trans women have the highest suicide rate of any other group in the United States, at almost half attempting in their lives, while cisgender black women attempt suicide at a rate of 1.7% on average.  
Trans students of color face higher rates of harassment and violence in schools. American Indian transgender students face the highest rates of sexual assault in school at 24%, followed by multiracial (18%), Asian (17%), and black (15%) students. White transgender students face a 9% rate of sexual assault in K–12.
Black trans women have a higher rate of HIV infection than other groups, with a 30.8–56.3% rate, versus 27.7% of MTF transgender people on average.

Police and incarceration

In the 2011 National Transgender Discrimination Survey, 22% of respondents who had interacted with the police reported harassment due to bias. 20% reported denial of equal services. 48% reported being uncomfortable asking for police assistance. Respondents who had served time in jail reported a higher rate of harassment by officers than by others in jail. For all respondents, 7% reported being held in a jail cell solely due to gender identity expression, while this number was 41% for black and 21% for Latino trans respondents. 
Transgender people have reported being refused medical care, particularly hormone therapy, in prison, with black trans people and American Indian trans people with the highest reporting rates.

See also 

 Discrimination against non-binary gender people
 Gay bashing
 Hate crime
 Homelessness among LGBT youth in the United States
 List of people killed for being transgender
 Transgender inequality
 Trust and safety issues in online dating services
 Transphobia
 Violence against LGBT people
 Violence against transgender people in the US

References

External links 
 National Center for Transgender Equality, National Center for Transgender Equality has information on hate crime laws in the United States
 Transgender victims in Massachusetts
 

Discrimination against transgender people
Violence against LGBT people
Abuse
LGBT terminology